Jungnyeong is a South Korean officer rank which is considered the equivalent of a lieutenant colonel (in the army and air force) and also to a commander in the South Korean navy.

The insignia of a South Korean jungnyeong is denoted by two silver starbursts worn on the collar.

See also 
 Chungjwa

Military ranks of South Korea